Prionopelta robynmae is a species of ant in the genus Prionopelta. It was discovered and described by Shattuck, S. O. in 2008, and is endemic to Australia.

References

Amblyoponinae
Hymenoptera of Australia
Insects described in 2008